The Real Exorcist is a film produced by HS Productions. The film follows the story of a young woman named Sayuri as she becomes an exorcist following being helped by the owner of a café named Extra after a panic attack. It stayed on the top of the Japanese box office for four weeks straight.

Plot 

The film begins with Sayuri walking into an alley following a panic attack caused by her ability to see evil spirits and ghosts. One of the owners of a nearby café named Extra, Yumeko, then walks out to find Sayuri crouching on the ground in distress and asks if she is okay.

The next scene shows a child riding a bicycle. As she rides, she is mysteriously wounded on her right cheek, seemingly for no reason. Her mother then brings her to Extra, where she meets Sayuri, who is working there as a part-time employee out of gratitude to Yumeko, who also provides spiritual help to those who need it. Sayuri then serves the mother a cup of coffee, then questions her about what happened to the child. The mother then tells her about the incident. Sayuri asks the girl to show her the scar. Sayuri then asks the mother to point the location on a map, which she does. She then closes her eyes and uses her supernatural powers to envision the moment when the incident happened and even does so in slow motion to see what wounded the child. Sayuri then opens her eyes and states that the bicycle was red, which the girl did not mention, proving to the mother that she possesses supernatural powers. She then explains what happened, and the mother then thanks her.

The scene after that shows a man named Isamu calling his girlfriend Kyoka to inform her that he just earned some money and is to go to the bank to deposit the cash. Shortly afterward, he is mugged in a tunnel and gets his money stolen. He then contemplates suicide as he walks into Extra, which just so happens to be nearby.

Isamu then sits down at a table, where Sayuri offers him coffee and asks him what happened. He then tells her the story and states that the police told him that the money may be irrecoverable. Sayuri then opens the map and tells him to point out the location of the incident. Sayuri then uses her supernatural powers. Afterward, she tells Isamu where the thief lives and tells him to go claim the money. Isamu then doubts that he will get the money back, but Sayuri then explains that the thief is extremely guilty for the crime he committed and that he will return the money. Isamu then thanks her, pays for the coffee and leaves.

The following scene switches to a high school where two girls chat near the sink in a restroom. Suddenly, they then hear someone in one of the stalls say that they want to die in a ghostly manner. The stall door then opens to reveal one of the girls' friends walking out, in doing so leaving the door open. They ask if it is her speaking, but she denies saying anything. The door then closes itself, and the three girls open the door to check if there is anyone in there. After they find no one, they quickly leave, resulting in one of the girls accidentally leaving her phone on the table. They then decide to go to Extra, where they meet Sayuri for the first time. Isamu then walks in to thank Sayuri for helping him get his money back. Sayuri then serves the girls some cake. Just as they try to take photos of it, the third girl notices that she forgot her phone, and the three girls start panicking about how to get it back, as they do not want to go back to the restroom. Sayuri then asks about what happened, and the girls then tell her the story. Sayuri then gives them her business card and tells them to contact her if anything goes wrong, and the girls thank her and leave.

Later that night, the girls then go back to school to reclaim the phone. They grab the phone, then see the door close itself. Scared, they call the number on the business card. Sayuri then runs to the high school, with Isamu following. They then go to the restroom, where Sayuri opens the restroom stall door and makes the ghost show itself, who is then revealed to be a student with a currently scarred face who committed suicide three years ago due to poor grades, and that she was the one who said that she wanted to die, as she saw the living student in the same stall take out an almost identical report card. Sayuri then uses her supernatural powers to send her to her next life.

The next day, Isamu goes with Kyoka to a shop to buy some shoes. Isamu then tells her about the event, though Kyoka ridicules him for "being weird." Isamu then notices Sayuri shopping nearby and tries to get Kyoka to leave. Just as they are about to, Kyoka receives a call telling her that a little girl in their family has disappeared. Isamu then gets Sayuri's help and the little girl is found successfully. Kyoka is then happy that the little girl has been found, but feels uneasy about Sayuri's powers.

Later, Isamu asks about Sayuri's origins. Sayuri then reveals that she was helped after collapsing next to Extra, and was given some books regarding exorcism—which are actual books by Happy Science–which improved her confidence. Afterward, she offers Isamu the opportunity to help her. They then walk out, continuing to chat. It is then revealed that Kyoka is jealously staring at the pair, with another woman lurking behind her. Later, a regular customer notifies her about it.

Sometime later, Kyoka goes for an audition, which she fails at, along with another actress, who was also the woman lurking behind her. Disappointed, she goes out with her friends, who make flattering comments about Isamu, which annoys her even further. Later, the other model requests that they talk at a nearby café. As they talk, the other model tells her to tell Isamu to stay away from Sayuri out of fear that she may be using witchcraft to steal him from Kyoka, as the audience sees her glitch.

Later, Kyoka and Isamu have a minor argument regarding his spending time with Sayuri, in which Kyoka demanded that he show her their chat history, only to find very generic conversations. She then tells him to stay away from Sayuri, which he laughs off. Meanwhile, Sayuri performs more exorcisms, even summoning the dead and expelling evil spirits. That night, the actress, who is actually a demon, enters her dreams and tries to convince her to give up her exorcism, only to fail.

One night, Kyoka sends an angry text. As she does so, the demon starts possessing her as she calls Isamu. She then tries to read a sutra to repel the demon, but is possessed before she manages to pick it up. She then rushes out and attempts to kill her mother. Afterward, she then runs to the rooftop as instructed by the demon and attempts to commit suicide, as her mother attempts to hold her back. Isamu then arrives and manages to help Kyoka's mother lift her onto her bed and restrain her, as Isamu calls Sayuri.

Back at Extra, Sayuri receives the phone call and quickly leaves Extra. She then goes to Kyoka's apartment and expels the demon, and in the morning, she and Kyoka reconcile.

The next day, the three chat at Extra. Two people then come in to ask for Sayuri's help, and the camera then pans to a shot of the original book on a bookshelf.

Cast 
 Fumika Shimizu as Sayuri, an exorcist and Extra employee.
 Mirai Irako as Isamu, a regular and friend of Sayuri whom she helped to reclaim his money. He is also Kyoka's boyfriend.
 Rin Kijima as Kyoka, Isamu's boyfriend and an actress. She used to be jealous of Sayuri but is now friends with her.
 Joe Hyuga as a master coffee brewer and one of the owners of Extra.
 Nao Hasegawa as Yumeko, one of the owners of Extra.
 Ryuchi Ohura as Onodera, a deceased doctor whom Sayuri helps reach heaven.
 Yoshimi Ashikawa as Ruriko, Kyoka's mother and an attempted victim while possessed.
 Ayumi Orii as Melephis, the demon who possesses Kyoka in an attempt to stop Sayuri's exorcism. She is later defeated by Sayuri.

Awards

References

External links
 

2020 films
2020s Japanese films
Japanese fantasy films
2020s Japanese-language films
Films about religion